Rhombic chess is a chess variant for two players created by Tony Paletta in 1980. The gameboard has an overall hexagonal shape and comprises 72 rhombi in three alternating colors. Each player commands a full set of standard chess pieces.

The game was first published in Chess Spectrum Newsletter 2 by the inventor. It was included in World Game Review No. 10 edited by Michael Keller.

Game rules
The diagram shows the starting setup. As in standard chess, White moves first and checkmate wins the game. Piece moves are described using two basic types of movement:
 Edgewise—through the common side of adjoining cells. If an edgewise move is more than one step, it continues in a straight line from the side of a cell through its opposite side, the line being orthogonal to these sides.
 Pointwise—through the sharpest corner of a cell, in a straight line to the next cell. (The paths are highlighted on the board by same-colored cells.)

Piece moves
 A rook moves edgewise only.
 A bishop moves pointwise. It can also move one step edgewise.
 The queen moves as a rook and bishop.
 The king moves one step edgewise or pointwise. There is no castling in rhombic chess.
 A knight moves in the pattern: one step edgewise followed by one step pointwise (or vice versa), away from its starting cell. Like a standard chess knight, it leaps any intervening men.
 A pawn moves forward one step edgewise, with the option of two steps on its first move. A pawn captures the same as it moves. There is no en passant capture in rhombic chess. A pawn promotes to any piece other than king when reaching  i (for White) and rank c (for Black).

Parachess

Circa 2000, Paletta created Parachess using the same board geometry but introducing additional ways to move:

These ways to move are highlighted on the board by same-colored cells.

Piece moves

Notes

References

Bibliography

External links
 Parachess by Tony Paletta, The Chess Variant Pages

Chess variants
1980 in chess
Board games introduced in 1980